Fruktime - a series of the carbonated soft drinks which are on sale in Russia and Ukraine, distribututed by The Coca-Cola Company. It is made in various flavouring variants: Buratino (caramel), Tarhun (tarragon), Hand bell (Bellflower), Lemonade, Pear, Strawberry, Apple, Cream soda, Kvass, and Baikal (Natural).

It is issued in bottles PET in capacity 0.5, 1 and 2 liters.

External links 
 A page about Fruktime on russian site of The Coca-Cola Company

Russian drinks
Coca-Cola brands